The Secretary of State for Equality and Gender Violence (SEIVG) of Spain is a senior minister within the Spanish Department of Equality. It is a political appointment made by the Monarch with the advice of the minister in charge of the ministerial department.

The Secretary of State for Equality is responsible for proposing and developing the Government's policies on equality, prevention and elimination of all kinds of discrimination against persons based on sex, racial or ethnic origin, religion or ideology, sexual orientation or identity of gender, age, disability or any other condition or personal or social circumstance, and of eradication of the different forms of violence against women, as well as violence against lesbian, gay, bisexual, transgender and intersex persons (LGBTI) and within the affective relationships of these.

From Secretariat of State depend two departments, the Directorate-General for Equality of Treatment and Diversity and the Government Delegation for Gender Violence.

History
The Government's equality policies got a greater leadership during the governments of PM José Luis Rodríguez Zapatero. At the very first, the equality department was within the Ministry of Labour and Social Affairs with the level of a General Secretariat between 2004 and 2008.

In 2008, after Zapatero's reelection, he elevated this department to a ministerial level, creating the Ministry of Equality until 2010 when the Ministry merged with the Ministry of Health and the Secretariat of State of Equality was properly created.

During the governments of PM Mariano Rajoy, the Secretariat merged with the Secretariat of State of Social Services creating the Secretariat of State of Social Services and Equality between very late 2011 and middle 2018.

In 2018, with the arrival of PM Pedro Sánchez the Secretariat of State recovered its full autonomy and importance when it was integrated in the Ministry of the Presidency, with the direct supervision of the Deputy Prime Minister. In January 2020, the Ministry of Equality was re-established and the Secretariat of State was integrated into it.

Structure
From the Secretary of State depends the following officials:
 The Director-General for Equality of Treatment and Diversity
 The Deputy Director-General for Equality of Treatment and Non-Discrimination
 The Council for the Elimination of Racial or Ethnic Discrimination
 The Government Delegation for Gender Violence
 The Deputy Director-General for Sensitization, Prevention and Knowledge of Gender-based Violence
 The Deputy Director-General for Inter-institutional Coordination in Gender Violence
 The State Observatory on Violence against Women
 The Cabinet of the Secretary of State for Equality
 The Chef de Cabinet
 Three Advisors

List of Secretaries of State for Equality
Before this office was created, all its duties were carried out by the Secretary General for Equality first and by the Minister of Equality later.

References

Secretaries of State of Spain
Equality rights